Sing My Welcome Home is the first studio album by Pacific Gold. Bad Christian Music released the album on March 24, 2015.

Critical reception

Sarah Brehm, indicating in a four star review at HM wrote, "It's an album filled with indie rock music that would be just as comfortable in the church as it would in a coffee house." Awarding the album four stars from Jesus Freak Hideout, Scott Fryberger states, "With Sing My Welcome Home, they've established themselves as one of the best worship bands of today." Timothy Estabrooks, giving the album three and a half stars for Jesus Freak Hideout, writes, "overall, Sing My Welcome Home is an effective and creative re-introduction to some classic hymns that definitely deserves a few spins." Rating the album four stars at Indie Vision Music, Scott Swan says, "Pacific Gold manages to not only re-energize lyrics from old, but also fosters a style that reawakens musical genres from bygone eras." Christian St. John, awarding the album four stars by Christian Review Magazine, describes, "Sing My Welcome Home is a pretty unique listening experience". Giving the album three stars for CM Addict, Jon Ownbey opines, "Sing My Welcome Home is a great album for those who enjoy the sounds of indie rock with lyrics that are spiritually focused."

Track listing

References

2015 debut albums
Pacific Gold albums